Sterling Ranch is an unincorporated community and a census-designated place (CDP) located in and governed by Douglas County, Colorado, United States. The CDP is a part of the Denver–Aurora–Lakewood, CO Metropolitan Statistical Area. Douglas County governs the unincorporated community and the Sterling Ranch Community Authority Board provides services through several metropolitan districts. The Littleton post office (Zip Code 80125) serves the area.

History
Construction of Sterling Ranch development began in early 2016, with eight builders offering single-family homes. The development comprises 3,400 acres and was to eventually house 33,000 residents. The full buildout for the community is projected to take 20 years and will include nine villages with a town center.

Sterling Ranch will include 30 miles of internal trails connecting to Chatfield State Park and Roxborough State Park and three regional parks. Nearly 40 percent of Sterling Ranch will remain open space, including two wildlife corridors.

Providence Village, the first of the nine villages in development, consists of just under 800 homes, a recreation center, church, school, civic center, and several parks.

Geography

Demographics

Education
The Douglas County School District RE-1 serves Sterling Ranch.

Water
Sterling Ranch is served by the Dominion Water and Sanitation District, which was building a water system with a water treatment facility on Sterling Ranch.

Technology
Sterling Ranch is Colorado’s first 1 Gig community. Every home has fiber optic lines running directly to it.

See also

Outline of Colorado
Index of Colorado-related articles
State of Colorado
Colorado cities and towns
Colorado census designated places
Colorado counties
Douglas County, Colorado
Colorado metropolitan areas
Front Range Urban Corridor
North Central Colorado Urban Area
Denver-Aurora-Boulder, CO Combined Statistical Area
Denver-Aurora-Broomfield, CO Metropolitan Statistical Area

References

External links

Sterling Ranch website
Sterling Ranch Community Authority Board website
Douglas County website

Census-designated places in Las Animas County, Colorado
Census-designated places in Colorado
Denver metropolitan area
Planned communities in the United States